Mowelfund, or the Movie Workers Welfare Foundation, is an organization in the Philippines that provides for the welfare of workers in the film industry.  As well as helping film workers in times of need, it provides support to various organizations including the Mowelfund Film Institute.

History

Mowelfund is a non-stock, non-profit social welfare, educational and industry development foundation established in 1974 by Joseph Estrada, at that time Mayor of San Juan and President of the Philippine Motion Picture Producers Association.
In addition to supporting the welfare of movie industry workers, Mowelfund reorganized the Board of Censors to become the Movie and Television Review and Classification Board and created the Film Academy of the Philippines.
Mowelfund handled the Metro Manila Film Festival until the People Power Revolution in 1986, when the government assumed responsibility.
In December 2011 Francis Tolentino, chair of the Metropolitan Manila Development Authority, expressed support for transferring responsibility for the festival back to private industry.

Activities

With about 4,500 members, Mowelfund provides financial support for hospitalization, surgery, medical fees and death benefits, and helps with housing and employment.
The foundation maintains an archive of old Filipino movies.
A museum was opened in 2005 in the Mowelfund headquarters, which are in a quiet part of Quezon City.
The museum is run on a shoestring budget, and can be visited only through arrangement.
Working with the Film Development Council of the Philippines, the Mowelfund Film Institute holds Intensive Filmmaking Workshops twice a year.
These have helped many aspiring young Filipino filmmakers who are now active internationally.
Mowelfund also campaigns against film and video piracy.

Fundraising

In March 2011 Mowelfund celebrated its 37th anniversary at the Mowelfund Plaza in Quezon city.
Former president and founder Joseph "Erap" Estrada was a guest of honor.
The Philippine Charity Sweepstakes Office and the Mowelfund sweepstakes partnership were launched at the event.
Through the partnership, Mowelfund beneficiaries could become dealers or agents of sweepstakes tickets, thus providing a livelihood.
In June 2011 Mowelfund organized a fundraising concert at the Cultural Center of the Philippines to celebrate the 92nd anniversary of Dalagang Bukid, the first Filipino-produced film, which was directed by Jose Nepomuceno.
Performers included Mitch Valdes, Dulce, Bituin Escalante, Jolina Magdangal and Janno Gibbs, supported by the Philippine Philharmonic Orchestra.  
In November 2011 Mowelfund held a celebrity bowling event in Eastwood Mall, Quezon city to raise funds.

References

Film organizations in the Philippines
Organizations established in 1974
1974 establishments in the Philippines